TCFA may refer to:

 Taichung Football Association, a football association in Taichung, Taiwan
 Tropical Cyclone Formation Alert, a bulletin in the United States